Lucian George Asanache (born 25 September 1994) is a Romanian professional footballer who plays as a defender or midfielder for CSM Focșani.

References

External links
 
 

1994 births
Living people
Romanian footballers
Liga I players
Liga II players
FCM Dunărea Galați players
ASC Oțelul Galați players
FC Delta Dobrogea Tulcea players
CS Concordia Chiajna players
ACS Foresta Suceava players
CS Luceafărul Oradea players
FC Metaloglobus București players
Association football defenders
Association football midfielders
Sportspeople from Galați